Georgian Honciu (born 24 April 1989) is a Romanian professional footballer who plays as a midfielder for Gloria Buzău.

Honciu made his Liga I debut on 22 July 2018, at 29 years old, when he played for Dunărea Călărași, club that also made its debut in the top flight, against Viitorul Constanța, scoring the only goal of the match. Until his debut in the Liga I, Georgian Honciu played in the Liga II and Liga III for clubs such as: Chindia Târgoviște, Fortuna Poiana Câmpina, Mioveni or Șirineasa.

References

External links
 
 

1989 births
Living people
Sportspeople from Târgoviște
Romanian footballers
Association football midfielders
Liga I players
FC Dunărea Călărași players
Liga II players
AFC Chindia Târgoviște players
CS Mioveni players
ACS Viitorul Târgu Jiu players
FC Argeș Pitești players
FC Gloria Buzău players